Wasserthaleben is a municipality in the district Kyffhäuserkreis, in Thuringia, Germany. It has a postal code of 99718.

References

Municipalities in Thuringia
Kyffhäuserkreis